Brachyscelio is an extinct genus of wasps belonging to the family Neuroscelionidae, fossils have been found in Baltic and Rovno amber.

Species:

Brachyscelio cephalotes 
Brachyscelio dubius 
Brachyscelio grandiculus

References

Platygastridae
Hymenoptera genera